Kylotonn SARL is a French video game development studio founded in 2006 in Paris. They are best known for their racing games, and are the official developer of the World Rally Championship video game series since 2015.

History 

4X Studio was founded in 2002 as a subsidiary of 4X Technologies. After releasing only one game under that name, Iron Storm, they closed and later reformed by Roman Vincent and Yann Tambellini as Kylotonn in 2006.

In 2012, Kylotonn developed the Play All technology with Wizarbox and Darkworks.

in 2014, the studio launched the KT Racing label.

In 2015, the company opened a facility in Lyon, Kylotonn Racing Games.

In 2017, the company won the 2017 Ping Award for "Best Sports Game" for WRC 7.

On 2 October 2018, French publisher Bigben Interactive announced that they had acquired Kylotonn. Kylotonn and Bigben had previously collaborated with each other since 2008.

Games

As 4X Studio

As Kylotonn

References

External links
 
 

Companies based in Paris
Video game companies established in 2002
Video game companies of France
Video game development companies
French companies established in 2002
2018 mergers and acquisitions
Nacon